{{DISPLAYTITLE:C2-Symmetric ligands}}
In homogeneous catalysis, C2-symmetric ligands refer to ligands that lack mirror symmetry but have C2 symmetry (two-fold rotational symmetry). Such ligands are usually bidentate and are valuable in catalysis. The C2 symmetry of ligands limits the number of possible reaction pathways and thereby increases enantioselectivity, relative to asymmetrical analogues. C2-symmetric ligands are a subset of chiral ligands. Chiral ligands, including C2-symmetric ligands, combine with metals or other groups to form chiral catalysts. These catalysts engage in enantioselective chemical synthesis, in which chirality in the catalyst yields chirality in the reaction product.

Examples
An early C2-symmetric ligand, diphosphine catalytic ligand DIPAMP, was developed in 1968 by William S. Knowles and coworkers of Monsanto Company, who shared the 2001 Nobel Prize in Chemistry. This ligand was used in the industrial production of -DOPA.

Some classes of C2-symmetric ligands are called privileged ligands, which are ligands that are broadly applicable to multiple catalytic processes, not only a single reaction type.

Mechanistic concepts
While the presence of any symmetry element within a ligand intended for asymmetric induction might appear counterintuitive, asymmetric induction only requires that the ligand be chiral (i.e. have no improper rotation axis). Asymmetry (i.e. absence of any symmetry elements) is not required. C2 symmetry improves the enantioselectivity of the complex by reducing the number of unique geometries in the transition states. Steric and kinetic factors then usually favor the formation of a single product.

Chiral fence

Chiral ligands work by asymmetric induction somewhere along the reaction coordinate. The image to the right illustrates how a chiral ligand may induce an enantioselective reaction. The ligand (in green) has C2 symmetry with its nitrogen, oxygen or phosphorus atoms hugging a central metal atom (in red). In this particular ligand the right side is sticking out and its left side points away. The substrate in this reduction is acetophenone and the reagent (in blue) a hydride ion. In absence of the metal and the ligand the Re face approach of the hydride ion gives the (S)-enantiomer and the Si face approach the (R)-enantiomer in equal amounts (a racemic mixture like expected). The ligand and metal presence changes all that. The carbonyl group will coordinate with the metal and due to the steric bulk of the phenyl group it will only be able to do so with its Si face exposed to the hydride ion with in the ideal situation exclusive formation of the (R) enantiomer. The re face will simply hit the chiral fence. Note that when the ligand is replaced by its mirror image the other enantiomer will form and that a racemic mixture of ligand will once again yield a racemic product. Also note that if the steric bulk of both carbonyl substituents is very similar the strategy will fail.

Other C2-symmetric complexes
Many C2-symmetric complexes are known.  Some arise not from C2-symmetric ligands, but from the orientation or disposition of high symmetry ligands within the coordination sphere of the metal.  Notably, EDTA and triethylenetetraamine form complexes that are C2-symmetric by virtue of the way the ligands wrap around the metal centers.  Two isomers are possible for (indenyl)2MX2, Cs- and C2-symmetric.  The C2-symmetric complexes are optically stable.

Asymmetric ligands
Ligands containing atomic chirality centers such asymmetric carbon, which usually do not have C2-symmetry, remain important in catalysis.  Examples include cinchona alkaloids and certain phosphoramidites. P-chiral monophosphines have also been investigated.

See also
 Chiral anion catalysis

Further reading

References

Coordination chemistry
Stereochemistry
Organometallic chemistry
Ligands